Ashton Chase Goudeau (born July 23, 1992) is an American professional baseball pitcher in the Detroit Tigers organization. Goudeau was drafted by the Kansas City Royals in the 27th round of the 2012 MLB draft. He has also played in Major League Baseball (MLB) for the Cincinnati Reds and Colorado Rockies.

Career

Amateur career
Goudeau attended Union High School in Union, Missouri. Undrafted out of high school, he attended Maple Woods Community College.

Kansas City Royals
The Kansas City Royals selected Goudeau in the 27th round of the 2012 MLB draft. Goudeau spent the 2012 season with the AZL Royals, going 1–1 with a 3.97 ERA over 34 innings. He spent the 2013 season with the Idaho Falls Chukars, going 1–5 with a 10.18 ERA over  innings. 

He split the 2014 season between Idaho Falls and the Lexington Legends, going a combined 1–0 with a 4.28 ERA over  innings. He split the 2015 season between Lexington and the Wilmington Blue Rocks, going a combined 7–4 with a 3.22 ERA over  innings. 

Goudeau split the 2016 season between Wilmington and the Northwest Arkansas Naturals, going 7–17 with a 5.29 ERA over  innings. He split the 2017 season between the AZL and Northwest Arkansas, going a combined 3–7 with a 5.10 ERA over 60 innings.

Seattle Mariners
On March 22, 2018, Goudeau, David McKay, Matt Tenuta, and Colin Rodgers were traded to the Seattle Mariners in exchange for $1. He split the 2018 season between the Modesto Nuts, Arkansas Travelers, and Tacoma Rainiers, going 6–11 with a 5.79 ERA over  innings. On November 2, 2018, Goudeau elected free agency.

Colorado Rockies
On November 16, 2018, Goudeau signed a minor league contract with the Colorado Rockies organization. He abandoned his ineffective slider, and focused on his  plus curveball. 

He spent the 2019 season with the Hartford Yard Goats, producing a 3–3 record with a 2.07 ERA over 78 innings with 91 strikeouts (10.5 strikeouts per nine innings), as he held batters to a .215 batting average. Goudeau played in the Arizona Fall League for the Salt River Rafters following the 2019 season, was 1-0 with a 0.00 ERA as in 13 innings he gave up four hits and no walks and had 18 strikeouts, and was named an AFL Rising Star. The Rockies added him to their 40-man roster after the 2019 season.

On July 23, 2020, Goudeau was promoted to the major leagues. He was optioned down on August 6 without appearing in a game for the Rockies. On August 17 he was recalled and made his major league debut on August 19 against the Houston Astros, ultimately pitching 8.1 innings for the Rockies in 2020. On November 20, 2020, Goudeau was designated for assignment.

On November 25, 2020, Goudeau was claimed off waivers by the Pittsburgh Pirates. He was then claimed by the Baltimore Orioles on December 7, 2020, the San Francisco Giants on March 18, 2021, and the Los Angeles Dodgers on April 10, 2021. On April 18, he returned to the Rockies on another waiver claim after the Dodgers designated him earlier in the day. On April 29, 2021, Goudeau was again designated for assignment by the Rockies.

Cincinnati Reds
On May 2, 2021, Goudeau was claimed off waivers by the Cincinnati Reds. On May 23, Goudeau made his first appearance of the year, pitching 2.1 hitless innings against the Milwaukee Brewers. In 5 games for the Reds, Goudeau posted an ERA of 4.00 with 5 strikeouts. On July 21, Goudeau was optioned to the Triple-A Louisville Bats. On July 28, Goudeau was designated for assignment by the Reds.

Colorado Rockies (second stint)
On July 29, 2021, Goudeau was traded back to the Colorado Rockies in exchange for cash considerations. On August 1, Goudeau collected his first career hit with a single off of San Diego Padres pitcher Reiss Knehr. He finished the year appearing in 11 games, posting a 2-1 record and 4.26 ERA with 17 strikeouts in 25.1 innings pitched.

In 2022, Goudeau made 12 appearances for Colorado, struggling to a 1-0 record and 7.08 ERA with one save and 16 strikeouts in 20.1 innings of work, On August 5, 2022, Goudeau was designated for assignment by the Rockies. He elected free agency on November 10, 2022.

Detroit Tigers
On February 23, 2023, Goudeau signed a minor league contract with the Detroit Tigers organization.

References

External links

1992 births
Living people
People from Newport, Arkansas
Baseball players from Arkansas
Major League Baseball pitchers
Colorado Rockies players
Cincinnati Reds players
Arizona League Royals players
Idaho Falls Chukars players
Lexington Legends players
Wilmington Blue Rocks players
Northwest Arkansas Naturals players
Arkansas Travelers players
Tacoma Rainiers players
Modesto Nuts players
Hartford Yard Goats players
Salt River Rafters players
Louisville Bats players